Achola  is a village in the southern state of Karnataka, India. Administratively, Achola is under Akera B. gram panchayat, Yadgir Taluka of Yadgir District in Karnataka.

Demographics
As of 2001 India census, Achola had a population of 843 with 398 males and 445 females.

See also
 Yadgir

References

External links 
 

Villages in Yadgir district